Mauritius ornate day gecko (Phelsuma ornata) is a diurnal species of gecko. It occurs on the island of Mauritius and some surrounding islands and typically inhabits different trees and bushes. The Mauritius ornate day gecko feeds on insects and nectar.

Description
 
This gecko is one of the smallest day geckos. It can reach a total length of about 12 cm. The back of the neck and head are greyish brown and bordered by white neck stripes. The body colour is quite variable. It can be bluish green, green with a blue area on the front back, or completely blue. The flanks are brown. The snout consists of an intricate pattern of cyan, white, red and dark blue. The back is covered with red coloured dots. The tail is turquoise with red transverse bars. The ventral side is off-white.

Distribution
This species is found on Mauritius, Round Island, Île aux Aigrettes (Île aux Aigrettes) and Coin de Mire. It is found in the coastal areas.

Habitat
Phelsuma ornata typically lives in the drier areas of Mauritius at low- and mid-elevation. It can be found on trees, other pantropic vegetation or on rocks where the original vegetation has been cleared.

A resident of Flic en Flac on the west coast of Mauritius reports that their garden has been colonised by these geckos. They can be seen walking all over the garden walls and the walls of the house, and some of them venture indoors, even spending the night behind wardrobes before going outside in the morning via the open windows.

Diet 
These day geckos feed on various insects and other invertebrates. They also like to lick soft, sweet fruit, pollen and nectar

Behaviour
This Phelsuma species can be quite shy in captivity. These day geckos are also surprisingly speedy. 

They seem not to be frightened by people - they stop on the wall, making eye contact, and look and listen to someone talking to them, but they appear not to be vocal, unlike the night geckos.

Reproduction
At a temperature of 28 °C, the young will hatch after approximately 40 days. The juveniles measure around 35 mm.

In 2014, an experiment with five Mauritius ornate day geckos was launched to space in order to test the effect of microgravity on gecko reproduction. The geckos died from a combination of factors due to a loss of communication with the satellite, including a life support malfunction which deactivated the heating system.

Care and maintenance in captivity
These animals should be housed in pairs in a well planted enclosure. The humidity should be maintained between 50 and 60% during the day and 80–90% at night. In captivity, these animals can be fed with crickets, wax moth larvae, fruit flies, mealworms and houseflies.

Notes

References
Henkel, F.-W. and W. Schmidt (1995) Amphibien und Reptilien Madagaskars, der Maskarenen, Seychellen und Komoren. Ulmer Stuttgart. 
McKeown, Sean (1993) The general care and maintenance of day geckos. Advanced Vivarium Systems, Lakeside CA.

External links

Phelsuma
Reptiles of Mauritius
Reptiles described in 1825
Taxa named by John Edward Gray